Richard Simon Ostfeld (born September 25, 1954) is a Distinguished Senior Scientist at the Cary Institute of Ecosystem Studies in Millbrook, New York. He is best known for his work on the ecology of Lyme disease, which he began studying while monitoring the abundance of small mammals in the forests of Cary Institute property in the early 1990s.

Education and employment 

Ostfeld received his B.S. in biology at the University of California at Santa Cruz in 1979 and his PhD in zoology from the University of California at Berkeley in 1985. From 1986 to 1989, he was a postdoctoral fellow at Boston University, and he has been a scientist at the Cary Institute of Ecosystem Studies since 1990.

Research 

Ostfeld's research centers on the ecology of infectious diseases. His work on Lyme disease has focused on how ecological processes (e.g. the masting of oak trees, predation) affect the probability that a tick will become infected with the bacterium that causes Lyme disease. He also studies the ecology of other tick-borne diseases, including babesiosis, anaplasmosis, and Powassan viral encephalitis. From 2016 to 2021, Ostfeld co-directed the Tick Project with Felicia Keesing to test whether environmental interventions could prevent Lyme and other tick-borne diseases for people living in residential neighborhoods of Dutchess County, New York.

His work falls into three main areas, all of which center on how the basic biology of ecological systems is affected by human impacts, such as biodiversity loss and climate change. First, he studies the effects of environmental variables on tick survival, behavior, and population performance to understand how risk for Lyme and other tick-borne diseases is changing as the climate warms. He has also studied how climate change affects infectious diseases at a global scale.

His second major area of research is the relationship between land use, biodiversity loss, and infectious disease. He has investigated how forest fragmentation affects wildlife habitat, causing species diversity to decline, and how this affects the abundance of ticks infected with pathogens that cause human diseases. He has explored the generality of this phenomenon for other infectious diseases, including zoonoses.

His third major research area is the ecology of eastern forests, particularly how a web of interconnected species is affected by pulsed resources (masting by oak trees), invasive species (spongy moths), and changes to biodiversity (e.g. loss of predators). He has generalized from the patterns observed in his long-term study systems in New York to explore the impacts of pulsed resources on ecosystem dynamics around the world.

Awards and recognition 

In 2009, Ostfeld received the C. Hart Merriam Award from the American Society of Mammalogists in recognition of "outstanding research in mammalogy over a period of at least 10 years". He is a fellow of the Ecological Society of America (2014), and a fellow of the American Association for the Advancement of Science (2014). In 2019, he was elected a fellow of the American Academy of Arts and Sciences.

Bibliography

Books

Selected papers

References

External links 

 Dr. Richard S. Ostfeld's Profile
 The Tick Project

1954 births
Living people
University of California, Berkeley alumni
University of California, Santa Cruz alumni
Boston University faculty
American ecologists
Fellows of the American Association for the Advancement of Science
Fellows of the American Academy of Arts and Sciences
Fellows of the Ecological Society of America